This is a list of films with religious themes.

List

See also
List of Christian films
List of Islam-related films
List of films based on the Bible

References

 
Religious